TR-DOS is a disk operating system for the ZX Spectrum with Beta Disc and Beta 128 disc interfaces. TR-DOS and Beta disc were developed by Technology Research Ltd (UK), in 1984. A clone of this interface is also used in the Russian Pentagon and Scorpion machines.

It became a standard and most disk releases for the ZX Spectrum, especially of modern programs, are made for TR-DOS as opposed to other disk systems. 

The latest official firmware version is 5.03 (1986).
Unofficial versions with various enhancements and bug-fixes have been released since 1990, with the latest being 6.10E (2006).

TR-DOS handles SS/DS, SD/DD floppy disks. All modern versions support RAM Disk and some versions support hard disks.

Current emulators support TR-DOS disk images in the formats .TRD or .SCL.

Commands 
The following list of commands is supported by TR-DOS V4.

 40
 CAT
 CLOSE
 COPY
 ERASE
 FORMAT
 GO TO
 INPUT
 LOAD
 MOVE
 NEW
 OPEN
 PRINT
 RETURN
 RUN
 SAVE

Utility programs include:
 FILER
 TAPECOPY (replaces BACKUP, COPY and SCOPY utility programs in TR-DOS V3)

See also
 iS-DOS
 CP/M
 DISCiPLE

References

External links
 World of Spectrum
 Virtual TR-DOS
 Web TR-DOS. Encyclopedia of TR-DOS, ZX Games

Microcomputer software
ZX Spectrum
Disk operating systems